A'Salt Creek Roller Girls (ACRG) is a women's flat track roller derby league in Casper, Wyoming, founded in December 2009. Player-owned and operated, A'Salt Creek fields a single team that competes against teams from other leagues. The league name is taken from the nearby Salt Creek Oil Field, one of the oldest and most productive oil fields in the area. A'Salt Creek is a member of the Women's Flat Track Derby Association (WFTDA).

ACRG played their first bout against the Rushmore Rollerz in Rapid City, South Dakota, on June 19, 2010, winning by one point (159-158). They hosted their first game in Casper on August 21, 2010, again playing Rushmore. More than 1400 spectators attended the 252–175 win.

ACRG was accepted into the Women's Flat Track Derby Association as an apprentice league in 2012 and graduated to full membership in 2014.

Rankings

 NR = no end-of-year ranking assigned

See also
History of roller derby
List of roller derby leagues

References

Roller derby leagues established in 2009
Roller derby leagues in Wyoming
2009 establishments in Wyoming
Sports in Casper, Wyoming
Women's sports in the United States
Women in Wyoming